Parliamentary elections were held in Lithuania in two stages on 20 October and 10 November 1996. All 141 seats in the Seimas were up for election; 70 based on proportional party lists and 71 in single member constituencies. Where no candidate gained more than 50% of the vote on 20 October, a run-off was held on 10 November.

The first round of the elections was held concurrently with a referendum to amend Articles 55, 57 and 131 of the constitution, and a referendum on the use of proceeds from privatization. The second round was held concurrently with a referendum to amend Article 47 of the constitution. Due to a low turnout, none of the referendum questions succeeded in getting approval from at least 50% of registered voters.

The result was a victory for the Homeland Union – Lithuanian Conservatives, which won 70 seats. They formed a coalition with second-place Lithuanian Christian Democratic Party. The Homeland Union benefited from dissatisfaction with the ruling Democratic Labour Party of Lithuania, which had failed to reignite the economy and was plagued by financial scandals. Gediminas Vagnorius was subsequently appointed as the Prime Minister.

Electoral system

In his decree on 9 April 1996, the President of Lithuania Algirdas Brazauskas set the date of the elections to the Seimas for 20 October. Elections took place under a mixed electoral system, with 70 MPs elected on proportional party lists and 71 MPs in single member constituencies. Run-off elections were to be held on 10 November in constituencies where no candidate received at least 50% of the votes cast.

In June 1994, Political Parties' and Political Organisations' Act was passed. This act set a notion that only political parties (and coalitions consisting them) could take part in the elections. Public organisations (e. g. Association of Poles in Lithuania) had to become political parties if it wanted to part in the elections.

In June 1996, the electoral threshold for the 70 proportional seats was increased from 4% to 5%, a new threshold of 7% was introduced for electoral coalitions and the exception for electoral lists of national minorities was eliminated. This change was mainly passed by the votes of the Democratic Labour Party of Lithuania and the Homeland Union. The combined purpose of the changes was to reduce the number of small parties in the parliament. The elections were also the first to allow voters to give preference votes to candidates on electoral lists, although their influence was limited (as some parties hadn't allowed this option for their lists). This system allowed voters to cast both positive and negative preference votes (the latter option allowed to express disapproval of candidates).

Campaign
The main contestants in the elections were the ruling Democratic Labour Party of Lithuania (LDDP) and the Homeland Union - Lithuanian Conservatives. The LDDP, led by Česlovas Juršėnas, had evolved from the Communist Party of Lithuania and won the 1992 election to the Seimas by a significant margin. Homeland Union, led by Vytautas Landsbergis, was founded in 1993 from elements of the Sąjūdis party, which started as a reform movement that had led the drive for independence from the Soviet Union.

Pre-election polls suggested a victory for the right-wing opposition over LDDP. The ruling party was suffering as a result of continued economic woes that were at the forefront of the debate: the economic situation was not improving as quickly as people expected. Financial scandals, including one involving former Prime Minister Adolfas Šleževičius, also played a major role. The opposition, on the other hand, promised improvement and stability on the domestic scene and a fight against corruption. Homeland Union secured the support of major business leaders before the election: in October 1996 Gediminas Vagnorius and Bronislovas Lubys, the leader of Lithuanian Confederation of Industrialists signed a memorandum, creating an alliance of politics and industry. Homeland Union also received support and financial contributions from international companies and Lithuanian diaspora. All major parties generally agreed on foreign policy goals of affiliation with NATO and European institutions.

Altogether 1,351 candidates representing 28 political parties contested for the 141 seats at stake, while 24 parties competed for the proportionally allocated seats.

Opinion polls

Results
In the elections characterized by a substantially lower turnout than before, Homeland Union gained 70 seats. Lithuanian Christian Democratic Party finished as a distant runner-up with 16 seats. The ruling LDDP won only 12 seats, compared to 73 in the previous elections.

The votes in the election were more dispersed than before. This, together with the changes to the electoral law increasing the threshold for nationwide constituency, had the effect of increasing the wasted votes in the constituency from 14% in elections of 1992 to 32% in 1996. It is the biggest share of wasted votes in Seimas election's history up to date.

Four seats were left vacant and new elections were to be held in four constituencies where the turnout did not reach the required 40%. Two of these seats were won by Electoral Action of Poles in Lithuania (Vilniaus Šalčininkų and Vilniaus Trakų constituencies), one by Centre Union of Lithuania (Trakų constituency), and the last one by Alliance of the Lithuanian National Minorities (Naujosios Vilnios constituency).

Aftermath
The newly elected Seventh Seimas elected Vytautas Landsbergis as its Speaker. As Homeland Union was one seat short of the majority, they were joined by the Christian Democrats in a coalition government. Gediminas Vagnorius of the Homeland Union was appointed the Prime Minister, while the leader of the Christian Democrats, Algirdas Saudargas was appointed the Minister of Foreign Affairs. Two members of the Centre Union of Lithuania, Algis Čaplikas and Imantas Lazdinis, joined the Government, but as individuals and not delegates of their party. Vincas Babilius of the Lithuanian Confederation of Industrialists became the Minister of Economy.

The newly formed coalition had supermajority in the parliament, what allowed it to amend the Constitution and overturn presidential vetoes.

These election marked the first time, when liberal party members were elected to the parliament of Lithuania.

References

Parliamentary elections in Lithuania
Lithuania
Parliamentary election